The 1949 Taça de Portugal Final was the final match of the 1948–49 Taça de Portugal, the 10th season of the Taça de Portugal, the premier Portuguese football cup competition organized by the Portuguese Football Federation (FPF). The match was played on 12 June 1949 at the Estádio Nacional in Oeiras, and opposed two Primeira Liga sides: Atlético CP and Benfica. Benfica defeated Atlético CP 2–1 to claim their fourth Taça de Portugal.

Match

Details

References

1949
Taca
S.L. Benfica matches
Atlético Clube de Portugal matches